Ässät Fan Club/Pataljoona ry, otherwise known as Pataljoona (Finnish for Battalion), is the official supporters' organization of Porin Ässät. Pataljoona is present at Ässät's home games and sometimes away games, especially Lukko–Ässät derby games. Pataljoona has chants supported by a drum, a megaphone, flags, signs and tifos. In Ässät home games, Pataljoona operates from the standing section of the Isomäki Areena.

Ässät's fans are known for their crazy behaviour and being loud in the arena, mostly in the Seisomakatsomo (standing section). During the 2008–09 season, Pataljoona was the third largest fan organization by members in Finland.

Pataljoona also works with the Karhunkämmen. Karhunkämmen is a fan club that works with multiple teams from Pori (e.g. Pesäkarhut, FC Jazz and Ässät).

History 

In the 2008–09 SM-liiga season, Pataljoona was the third largest fan organization by members in Finland, if only registered organizations are counted.

In a game against Ilves on October 16 2021, Pataljoona left the stands and watched the game from the hallway as protest for Ässät's poor playing. Ässät finished last in the regular season. 

In 2022, Pataljoona started to work with Karhunkämmen.

Rivalries 

Pataljoona's main rival is considered to be Raumam Boja, the fan organization of Rauman Lukko. In 2015, Pataljoona had left their flags and a banderole on a bus that later carried the Raumam Boja group in it. Reportedly RB had stolen the equipment.

References 

Ässät